Mount Hay, also named Boundary Peak 167, is a mountain in Alaska and British Columbia, located on the Canada–United States border, and part of the Fairweather Range of the Saint Elias Mountains. It was named in 1923 for John Milton Hay (1838-1905), author and diplomat. In 1903, John Hay helped negotiate the treaty resulting in Alaska Boundary Tribunal.

See also
List of Boundary Peaks of the Alaska-British Columbia/Yukon border

References

Mountains of Alaska
Two-thousanders of British Columbia
Saint Elias Mountains
Canada–United States border
International mountains of North America
Mountains of Yakutat City and Borough, Alaska